Tales of Wonder is the eighth album by the Christian rock band White Heart and the band's first with Jon Knox as drummer. Chris McHugh played all drum tracks (except "Vendetta") although Knox was the official drummer for the tour.It is their second album on Star Song Records released in 1992.The album is produced by White Heart founders Mark Gersmehl and Billy Smiley with Brown Bannister as a production consultant and who previously worked with them on their 1989 album Freedom. Every track on Tales of Wonder charted on both Christian Rock and Radio (AC/CHR) charts, except "Morningstar" and "Gabriella." A full-length track of "Morningstar" is heard on their 1994 compilation Nothing But the Best: Radio Classics. The album peaked at number 2 on the Billboard Top Christian Albums chart. White Heart earned their second Grammy nomination, their first since 1984, for Best Rock Gospel Album for Tales of Wonder at the 35th Grammy Awards.

Track listing

Personnel 

White Heart
 Rick Florian – lead vocals, backing vocals
 Mark Gersmehl – keyboards, recorder, lead vocals, backing vocals
 Billy Smiley – Rickenbacker 12-string guitar, hi-string guitar, 12-string acoustic guitar, backing vocals
 Brian Wooten – lead guitar, rhythm guitar, gut-string guitar
 Anthony Sallee – bass guitar, fretless bass
 Jon Knox – drums (8)

Additional musicians
 Blair Masters – sound effects (6), synth bass (9), percussion programming (9)
 Chris McHugh – drums (1-7, 9, 10, 11)
 The "Handbell Choir" (Dave Ecrement, Mark Gersmehl and Amy Rogers) – choir (10)

Production 

 Darrell A. Harris – executive producer
 Mark Gersmehl – producer
 Billy Smiley – producer
 Brown Bannister – production consultant
 Ronnie Brookshire – engineer, mixing (1-6, 8, 9)
 Jeff Balding – mixing (7, 10)
 Richie Biggs – additional engineer, recording (11), mixing (11)
 Lee Groitzsch – additional engineer
 Richard Indelicato – assistant engineer
 Patrick Kelly – assistant engineer, mix assistant (1-10)
 Shawn McLean – assistant engineer 
 Anthony Zecco – assistant engineer
 Daniel Johnston – mix assistant (1-6, 8, 9)
 Doug Sax – mastering at The Mastering Lab, Hollywood, California
 Toni Thigpen – art direction, creative director
 Todd Tufts – art direction, design
 Mark Tucker – photography
 The Bennett House, Franklin, Tennessee – recording location
 The Dugout, Nashville, Tennessee – recording location
 OmniSound Studios, Nashville, Tennessee – recording location, mixing location
 Woodland Studios, Nashville, Tennessee – mixing location
 Production Group, Spokane, Washington – recording location, mixing location

Charts

Radio singles

References

1992 albums
White Heart albums